Alexander or Alex Campbell may refer to:

Politicians and military officers

Canadian
Alexander Campbell (Upper Canada politician) (1770–1834), farmer and political figure in Upper Canada
Alexander Franklin Campbell (1845–?), Canadian politician
Alexander Campbell (Canadian senator) (1822–1892), legislator, minister, Lieutenant Governor, and Senator
Alexander B. Campbell (born 1933), premier of Prince Edward Island (1966–78)
Alexander Campbell (Nova Scotia politician) (1826–1909), Scottish-born notary public and political figure in Nova Scotia, Canada
Alexander Campbell (Newfoundland politician) (1876–1940), physician, fox rancher and political figure in Newfoundland
Max Campbell (Alexander Maxwell Campbell, 1888–1962), Canadian politician

American
Alexander Campbell (American politician) (1779–1857), Ohio politician who served in the United States Senate
Alexander Campbell (Illinois politician) (1814–1898), member of the Illinois House of Representatives and the United States House of Representatives
Alexander M. Campbell (1907–1968), Indiana lawyer and Assistant U.S. Attorney General
Alexander William Campbell (general) (1828–1893), American Civil War Confederate general

British
Alexander Cameron Campbell, MP for Argyllshire, 1841–1843
Alexander Douglas Campbell (1899–1980), British Army officer
Sandy Campbell (British Army officer) (Alexander Fraser Campbell, 1898–1940), George Cross recipient
Alexander Glynn Campbell (1796–1836), MP for Fowey 1819–1820
Alexander Henry Campbell (1822–?), British Conservative politician
Sir Alexander Campbell, 1st Baronet (1760–1824), British general
Alexander Campbell of Carco (d. 1608), Scottish noble and prelate
Alexander Campbell (1756–1785), British Army officer and MP for Nairnshire
Alexander Campbell of Possil (1754–1849), military officer
Alexander Campbell (died 1832), British Army officer and MP for Anstruther Burghs
Alexander Campbell (Royal Navy officer) (1874–1957)

Australian
Alexander Campbell (sea captain) (1805–1890), whaler and colonist in the Port Fairy region
Alexander Campbell (Australian politician) (1812–1891), New South Wales politician
Alexander James Campbell (1846–1926), Australian politician

Other people
Alex Campbell (footballer) (fl. 1926–1929), footballer for Clapton Orient
Alex Campbell (ice hockey) (born 1948), Canadian former ice hockey player
Alex Campbell (singer) (1925–1987), Scottish folk singer
Alex Campbell (golfer) (1876–1942), Scottish golfer and golf course architect
Alexander Buchanan Campbell (1914–2007), Scottish architect
Alexander Campbell (journalist) (died 1961), English newspaper editor
Alexander Campbell (suspected Molly Maguire) (c. 1833–1877), Irish-born tavern owner, executed in Pennsylvania 
Alexander Campbell (minister) (1788–1866), Religious reformer on the American Frontier 
Alexander Campbell (musician and writer) (1764–1824), Scottish musician and miscellaneous writer
Alexander Campbell of Carco (died 1608), Scottish prelate, bishop of Brechin
Alexander Petrie Campbell (1881–1963), Australian-born religious leader
Alexander Campbell (dancer) (born 1986), dancer with the Royal Ballet
Alexander Lorne Campbell (1871–1944), Scottish architect
Whitey Campbell (1926–2015), American football, basketball, baseball, player and coach
Alexander Campbell (footballer) (1883–?), Scottish footballer

See also
Sandy Campbell (disambiguation)
Alec Campbell (disambiguation)
Alasdair Caimbeul (writer) (born 1941), Scottish Gaelic author
Alexander Hume-Campbell (1708–1760) (1708–1760), Scottish nobleman and politician
Alexander Campbell Fraser (1819–1914), Scottish philosopher